Avelino González Mallada (August 7, 1894 in Gijón – March 27, 1938 in Woodstock) was an Asturian anarchist.

Biography
Born in Gijón on August 7, 1894, he was orphaned at the age of six. In 1905, at the age of eleven, he began working at the Laviada factory, where he first came into contact with the anarchist movement in 1908. He joined the CNT in 1911, which led him to be fired from his job in 1915 for his militancy. He emigrated to Paris, where he remained until 191]. When he returned, he could not secure a job as he found himself on the employer's black list, so he moved to La Felguera where he taught in a rationalist school. In 1922 he returned to Gijón, where he directed the newspaper Vida Obrera. In September 1925 he was elected General Secretary of the CNT, a post which he held until July 1926. He was replaced by Segundo Blanco, whom he had accompanied to the Congress of the Portugal CGT a year earlier. In 1926 he worked as a teacher at the Neutral School, with the pedagogue Eleuterio Quintanilla.

With the proclamation of the Second Spanish Republic, he was put in charge of directing the CNT's newspaper Solidaridad Obrera and until 1933 he was on the CNT Regional Committee in Madrid. He was became a member of the FAI and the Jovellanos Masonry Lodge. In 1934 he was one of the people in favor of the CNT's participation in the Workers' Alliance, and in 1935 he was commissioned to reorganize the Regional Committee of the CNT in Asturias.

When the Spanish coup of July 1936 took place, he was one of the organizers of the Provincial Committee of the Popular Front of Asturias and represented the CNT in the Gijón Defense Council. On October 15, 1936, he was elected Mayor of Gijón, where a street bears his name today. When Franco's troops entered Gijón in October 1937 he fled to Barcelona, where he remained until February 1938, when he was appointed special delegate of the General Council of International Anti-Fascist Solidarity and moved to the United States to raise aid for the Republican cause. After being received by the Republican Ambassador Fernando de los Ríos Urruti in Washington DC, he organized several rallies in New York City.

He died in a car accident in Virginia on March 27, 1938, while he was traveling to California to take part in a series of propaganda actions in favor of republican Spain. He left a widow, Florentina Fernández and two children, Avelino and Amapola.

Bibliography

References 

People from Gijón
1894 births
1938 deaths
People from Asturias
Spanish anarchists
Secretaries General of the Confederación Nacional del Trabajo